The Historic Automobile Group International (HAGI) is a London-based research organization in the area of rare historic motorcars and collectors’ automobiles. HAGI is known for its classic car market indices, which have been calculated since December 2008, based on a proprietary market capitalization formula called “survivor weighting”.

Founded in 2007 HAGI has strong established links with members of the financial industry in London, Asia and North America, as well as the sector for historic motorcars.

Founding members are Dietrich Hatlapa, a former managing director of ING Barings financial markets, Hardeep Sohanpal, a publishing expert and private aviation specialist. They were joined by David Selby, a senior writer and journalist in the classic car sector and index expert Bruce Johnson, an independent advisor to global financial companies and author of The Hedge Fund Fraud Case Book.

The purpose of the research initiative is to improve transparency in the sector and create the initial foundations for an investment infrastructure into this long established area of ‘passion’ investment.

HAGI runs a proprietary database of actual transactions in the sector for rare classic cars. Data is sourced from four areas: Private transactions, dealer transactions, marque experts and auction results.

HAGI describes itself as an “independent research house and think tank with specialized expertise in the rare classic motorcar sector”.

HAGI claims more than 1,000 individual members from more than 15 countries.

The group has developed a set of professional indices (HAGI Indices) and releases index data on a monthly basis for five indices. HAGI Top  and HAGI Top ex F&P are market indices whereas HAGI F (Ferrari), HAGI MBCI (Mercedes-Benz) and HAGI P (Porsche) are car marque specific indices. Index readings, other research results and market comments are published on its website Historic Automobile Group, in the Financial Times, and in Octane Magazine, a classic car special interest magazine based in the UK.

HAGI has been involved in a number of academic papers focusing on the classic car market.

Founder Dietrich Hatlapa  published a reference book about the classic car market in May 2011.

Classic Car Indices by HAGI

HAGI Top, market cap weighted index for the total market of rare classic cars.
HAGI MBCI, market cap weighted index for rare Mercedes-Benz classic cars.
HAGI F, market cap weighted index for rare Ferrari classic cars.
HAGI P, market cap weighted index for rare Porsche classic cars.
HAGI Top ex P&F, market cap weighted index for the total market of rare classic cars other than Porsche and Ferrari.

Senior research staff

Dietrich Hatlapa
Bruce Johnson
Hardeep Singh-Sohanpal
David Selby
Ludovic Lindsay

Council

Karl Ludvigsen, automotive consultant and historian
Fergus MacLeod, head of investor relations BP plc.
Philip Basil, former head of RBS asset management
Dr. Warren Eads, founder, Spydersports, USA

See also
Most expensive cars sold in auction

Fruits of Passion

References

Alan van Bergen - How do Classic Ferraris Perform as a Financial Instrument? – Master Thesis, Tias Nimbas Business School, 2009

John Reed - Rare cars put investors in pole position - Financial Times, 29 August 2009.

Adrian Finighan – Classic Car Investment -  CNN, 22 September 2009.

CNBC.com – Classic Car Market on Bumpy Road – 10 November 2009.

Octane Magazine – Market Comment, monthly since November 2009.

Thomas Hillenbrand – Rasende Rendite – Der Spiegel, 18 December 2009.

Seth Lubove – Classic Obsession – Bloomberg Markets Magazine, September 2010.

Scott Reyburn -  McCartney’s Lamborghini for Sale; Bacon Priced $18 Million - Bloomberg.com, 31 May 2011

Sona Blessing - Alternative Alternatives: Risk, Returns and Investment Strategy, Wiley Finance, 2011, pp. 199–204

Dietrich Hatlapa - Better than Gold: Investing in Historic Cars - HAGI Publishing, May 2011.

External links
 Historic Automobile Group official website.

Motor clubs
Clubs and societies in the United Kingdom